State Route 265 (SR 265) is a  route that serves as a connection between SR 21/SR 47 at Beatrice with SR 28/SR 41 at Camden.

Route description
The northern terminus of SR 265 is located at its intersection with SR 28/SR 41 in Camden. The route then takes a southerly track to its southern terminus at SR 21/SR 47 in Beatrice.

Major intersections

References

External links

265
Transportation in Monroe County, Alabama
Transportation in Wilcox County, Alabama